Yehudah Aryeh Leib Alter (15 April 1847 – 11 January 1905), also known by the title of his main work, the Sfas Emes (Ashkenazic Pronunciation) or Sefat Emet  (Modern Hebrew), was a Hasidic rabbi who succeeded his grandfather, Rabbi Yitzchak Meir Alter, as the Av beis din (head of the rabbinical court) and Rav of Góra Kalwaria, Poland (known in Yiddish as the town of Ger), and succeeded Rabbi Chanokh Heynekh HaKohen Levin of Aleksander as Rebbe of the Gerrer Hasidim.

Biography

Early years
He was born in 1847 (5608) and named Yehudah Leib; he was known to family and friends as Leybl. His father, Rabbi Avraham Mordechai Alter, died when Yehudah Leib was only eight years old, and his mother Mrs. Esther Alter (née Landsztajn) died before that. Orphaned of both parents, he was brought up by his grandparents, Rabbi Yitzchak Meir Alter (known as the Chiddushei Harim) and his wife. When he was about ten years old, his grandfather took him to visit the Kotzker Rebbe, which left a lifelong impression on him.

He married Yocheved Rivka, daughter of Yehuda Leib ("Yidl") Kaminer. In order not to have the same name as his father-in-law, his own name was changed to Yehudah Aryeh Leib. He is said to have been attached to the name Yehudah, and was upset at not being able to use it as his name any longer.

Leadership
When his grandfather, Yitzchak Meir, died in 1866, many of the Gerrer Hasidim sought to bestow the mantle of leadership upon eighteen-year-old Yehudah Aryeh Leib. He refused that position, and leadership went to Rabbi Chanokh Heynekh HaKohen Levin of Aleksandrów Łódzki. However, after the death of the latter in 1870, the Hasidim succeeded in gaining Alter's assent to become their Rebbe.

Death and burial
During the Russo-Japanese War, many of his young followers were drafted into the Russian Army and sent to the battlefields in Manchuria. Alter was very worried over these devotees and would constantly write to them. His health suffered, and he died at the age of 57 on 11 January 1905 (5 Shevat 5665).

Succession
Alter was succeeded as Gerrer Rebbe by his son, Rabbi Avraham Mordechai Alter. Most of Gerrer hasidim followed Avraham Mordechai, but some chasidim followed the brother-in-law of Alter - Rabbi Pinchas Menachem Justman of Piltz.

Lasting influence
Alter was one of the greatest Torah scholars of his generation, teaching students such as Rabbi Nachman Shlomo Greenspan and many others. His output was prodigious, and his works (all entitled Sfas Emes) deal with the Talmud, the ethics of the Midrash, and mysticism of the Zohar.

His Torah homilies as delivered to his hasidim, and arranged according to the weekly parashah and the festivals, were the first to be published posthumously under the name Sfas Emes. The title was taken from the closing words of the final piece he wrote (Sfas Emes, Vayechi 5665). His chiddushim (original Torah thoughts) on many Talmudic tractates, and on Yoreh De'ah, have been published under the same name.

The Sochatchover Rebbe, Rabbi Avrohom Bornsztain (known as the Avnei Nezer), a leading Torah scholar and posek in his own right, is said to have maintained two bookcases — one for Rishonim (earlier commentators) and another for Acharonim (later commentators). The volumes of the Sfas Emes, written in the late 1800s, were to be found in his bookcase containing the Rishonim. To study some portions of the Talmud without the Sfas Emes is unthinkable to the modern-day scholar. 

The Sfas Emes Yeshiva in Jerusalem is named after him and includes his teachings in the curriculum.

His sayings

Bibliography
 Arthur Green, The Language of Truth: The Torah Commentary of Sefat Emet (Jewish Publication Society, 1998).
 Articles by Dr. Yoram Jacobson.
 Exile and Redemption in Gur Hasidism (Heb.), Da'at, 2-3 (1978–1979), pp. 175–215.
 Truth and Faith in Gur Hasidic Thought (Heb.), in: Studies in Jewish Mysticism, Philosophy and Ethical Literature Presented to Isaiah Tishby, Jerusalem, 1986, pp. 593–616.
 The Sanctity of the Mundane in the Hasidic School of Gur - Studies in the Understanding of the Sabbath in the Homilies of Sefat Emet (Heb.), in: Hasidism in Poland, Jerusalem, 1994, pp. 241–277.
 From Youth to Leadership and from Kabbalah to Hasidism - Stages in the Spiritual Development of the Author of Sefat Emet (Heb.), in: Rivkah Shatz-Uffenheimer Memorial Volume, II, Jerusalem, 1996, pp. 429–446.
 Primordial Chaos and Creation in the Thought of Gur Hasidism, or: the Sabbath that Preceded Creation (Polish), in Duchowosc Zydowska w Polsce, Kraków, 2000, pp. 151–171.

References

External links
 "Sefas Emes Project" Translations of the Sefat Emet as PDFs
 Sfas Emes Blog A new homily translated each week in clear easy to understand English
 Sfas Emes in Hebrew (PDF scans)
 Sefas Emes – 1 Bereisheis Sefat Emet Hebrew vol. 1   
 Sefas Emes – 2 Shmos Sefat Emet Hebrew vol. 2   
 Sefas Emes – 3 Vayikra Sefat Emet Hebrew vol. 3   
 Sefas Emes – 4 Bamidbar Sefat Emet Hebrew vol. 4   
 Sefas Emes – 5 Devarim Sefat Emet Hebrew vol. 5   

1847 births
1905 deaths
Rebbes of Ger
Polish Orthodox rabbis
19th-century Polish rabbis
Clergy from Warsaw